is a Japanese former football player. He played for Japan national team.

Club career
Miyata was born on January 15, 1923. After graduating from Waseda University, he joined Tanabe Pharmaceutical in 1946.

National team career
In March 1951, Miyata was selected Japan national team for Japan team first game after World War II, 1951 Asian Games. At this competition, on March 7, he debuted against Iran. He also played at 1954 Asian Games. He played 6 games for Japan until 1954.

Coaching career
After retirement, Miyata became a manager for Tanabe Pharmaceutical in 1961. The club joined Japanese Regional Leagues in 1968 and new division Japan Soccer League Division 2. In 1972 season, he led the club 2nd place and promoted Division 1. However, in 1973 season, the club was the lowest place and he resigned.

National team statistics

Honours
Japan
Asian Games Bronze medal: 1951

References

External links
 
 Japan National Football Team Database

1923 births
Possibly living people
Waseda University alumni
Japanese footballers
Japan international footballers
Tanabe Mitsubishi Pharma SC players
Japanese football managers
Asian Games medalists in football
Asian Games bronze medalists for Japan
Footballers at the 1951 Asian Games
Medalists at the 1951 Asian Games
Footballers at the 1954 Asian Games
Association football midfielders